Zhongjin Gold is a Chinese mining corporation mainly focusing on non-ferrous metals, such as gold, copper, and platinum. The corporation is based in Beijing, and holds mines in across China. They recently acquired two large gold production companies in Shandong, after winning a bidding war against Shandong Gold. The company's largest single gold mine in the Dazhuohan mine, producing 500,000 metric tonnes concentrate a year. They are currently traded on the Shanghai Stock Exchange as "Company 600489", and are listed on Forbes "Asia's Fab 50" list in 2011.

Key Company Officials
Chairman- Xin Song
Directors- Xin Song, Congsheng Liu, Bing Liu, Haiqing Du
General Manager- Jinding Wang
Secretary of the Board- Yueqing Li
Deputy General Managers- Nailin Zhang, Ruixiang Wang, Weihua Qu

External links
1. Company Website
2. Google Finance Page
3. Reuters Finance Page
4. Zhongjin, Shandong Gold compete for two gold companies
5. Asian Fab 50 Entry on Forbes

Mining companies of China
Companies based in Beijing
Companies listed on the Shanghai Stock Exchange